Bambusa brevispicula is a species of Bambusa bamboo.

Distribution 

Bambusa brevispicula is endemic to New Guinea.

Description 
Bambusa brevispicula is perennial and has 6 stamen.

References 

brevispicula
Flora of New Guinea
Endemic flora of New Guinea